N-lysine methyltransferase KMT5A is an enzyme that in humans is encoded by the KMT5A gene. The enzyme is a histone methyltransferase, SET domain-containing and lysine-specific. The enzyme transfers one methyl group to histone H4 lysine residue at position 20. S-Adenosyl methionine (SAM) is both the cofactor and the methyl group donor. The lysine residue is converted to N6-methyllysine residue.

This histone modification is often abbreviated H4K20me1:
 H4 - type of histone
 K - symbol of lysine
 20 - position of the lysine residue modified
 me - abbreviation for methyl group
 1 - number of methyl groups transferred

References

Further reading